The acronym MPAS may refer to:

 Magazine Publisher's Association of Singapore
 Maritime and Port Authority of Singapore
 Master of Physician Assistant Studies
 Ministry of Public Administration and Security (South Korea)
 Model for Prediction Across Scales, a coupled Earth system model consisting of atmospheric, oceanographic, cryospheric, and land surface components
 Mornington Peninsula Astronomical Society 
 Methenamine Periodic Acid Schiff Stain, or Jones' stain

See also
 
 
 MPA (disambiguation)